France Info (stylised as franceinfo:) is a French public broadcasting service produced in collaboration with France Télévisions, Radio France, France Médias Monde and the Institut national de l'audiovisuel. 

The service includes a radio network, a TV channel, a website, and a mobile application.

Background
Launched on 1 June 1987 by Radio France, France Info is Europe's first radio network that broadcasts live news and information 24 hours a day, serving most regions in France in 105.5 MHz. On 11 July 2016, the name of France Télévisions' then-upcoming news channel was announced to be France Info, which was launched on 1 September that year. This gathered the radio, television and online services under the banner of France Info.

Online
On 24 August 2016, France Télévisions' France TV Info online service and Radio France's France Info website were merged into a new look service. It serves as the official website of both France Info radio and television channels, as well as Radio France and France Télévisions' news offerings.

References

External links
  

France Télévisions
France Médias Monde
Radio France
News media in France